The Byron Bay Film Festival is a popular AACTA Awards accredited independent awards-based film event held in the late Australian summer at the Byron Community & Cultural Centre, in the coastal town of Byron Bay.

The festival was established in 2005 by the then Byron Community & Cultural Centre Venue Manager Greg Aitken; local Byron Bay Filmmakers David Warth, John Abegg, Vera Wasowski and current Co-Director Osvaldo Alfaro. In late 2008 the festival changed its name to the Byron Bay International Film Festival but still continues to use the acronym BBFF as it has done previously.

Award categories
Awards are given to the winners of the following categories:

 Best Film
 Best Dramatic Feature
 Best Documentary
 Best Cinematography
 Best Surf Film
 Best Environmental Film
 Best Short Film
 Best Young Australian Filmmaker
 Best Byron Bay Film
 Best Experimental Film
 Best Animation
 Best Music Video
 Best CinematicVR Experience
 Best Interactive VR Experience
 Byron Bay International Screenplay Competition

Co_Lab_Create
Where Australia's XR Community Connects

Byron Bay Film Festival organises a program of cutting-edge film content, a weekend of events, workshops and masterclasses specifically aimed at the growing Virtual Reality (VR)/ Augmented Reality (AR) sectors and the industries that have helped drive the creation of this medium – Venture Capital, Gaming, Film & VFX.

BBFF creates a networking of creative professionals who want to grow their technical knowledge and the possibilities for Australasia's XR Industry. Co_Lab_Create provides connections, skills and knowledge enhancement in the unique and beautiful setting of one of the world's most famous beachside towns.

Festival presentations

BBFF06
The first festival ran in early 2006 and screened 55 Australian films from 18–25 January.

BBFF07
The 2007 Byron Bay Film Festival was the first to allow international entries and ran from 9–17 February, during which 100 films from 24 countries were screened.

BBFF08
The 2008 Byron Bay Film Festival also ran for nine days from 29 February to 8 March 2008 during which 152 films from 34 countries were screened. The Indian-Malaysian entry Laya Project won the Best Film award on the final night of the 2008 festival. It was directed by Harold Monfils.

BBFF09/10
The nine-day festival was not held during 2009. In Brisbane for Earth Day 5 June 2009 BBFF presented 2 Best of BBFF Sessions at Greenfest 09. The next festival ran from 5–13 March 2010.

BBFF2011
The festival ran from March 4 to 13 in 2011, expanding to 10 days and also screening in neighbouring Lismore.

BBFF2012
The 2012 Byron Bay International Film Festival ran from March 2 to 11 at five venues across Byron Bay, Lismore and Murwillumbah. The program included the inaugural Full Moon Cinema screening.

BBFF2013
The 7th Byron Bay International Film Festival was held from March 1 to 10 2013 and screened 222 films in 55 sessions from 42 countries. 13 films had their world premiere and 122 had an Australian premiere. South African film, Otelo Burning, directed by Sara Blecher, was the first in the festival's history to collect a hat trick of awards, including Best Film, Best Dramatic Feature and Best Surf Film.

BBFF2014
The 8th Byron Bay International Film Festival was held between 28 February and 9 March 2014. It screened 222 films from 36 countries. 43 films had their world premiere and 102 had an Australian premiere. Opening Night film, When My Sorrow Died: The Legend of Armen Ra And The Theremin received a standing ovation and collected the Best Film and Best Documentary Awards.

In May 2014, for the first time Byron Bay International Film Festival collaborated with Vivid Sydney, presenting the workshop "Strategies For A Successful Sea Change", in which it sought to demonstrate how creative talent can forge their career from the Northern Rivers of NSW. At the Vivid Sydney awards, the festival received one of only two special commendations from the NSW state government as a NSW Emerging Creative Talent.

BBFF2015
The 9th Byron Bay International Film Festival was held between 6 and 15 March 2015. Frackman picked up Best Film and Best Environmental Film at the 2015 Byron Bay International Film Festival.

BBFF2016 
In 2016 the festival switched their dates to the Australian spring - with the 10th Byron Bay International Film Festival held Oct 14th to 23rd, while the festival had been introducing Virtual Reality to attending filmmakers since 2013 BBFF2016 marked the first official introduction of Virtual Reality within the program. Two VR/AR/MR focused weekends top and tailed the festival - on the Opening Weekend BBFF presented Co_Lab_Create_v001 - a weekend think-tank aimed at VR/AR Creators whilst the closing weekend featured Ncube8 - which was an introductory weekend of workshops, panels and demonstrations aimed at filmmakers and the public.

BBFF2017 
The 11th edition of the Byron Bay International Film Festival was held between 6 and 15 October 2017, with fifteen international premieres, and eighty Australian premieres. 
 
Best Documentary Film Award : 'City of Joy' directed by Madeleine Gavin 
Best Environmental Film Award : 'Blue' directed by Karina Holden 
Best Music Video : 'Love' is a lonely dancer by Antony & Cleopatra, directed by Alan Masferrer 
Best Short Film Award : 'Uncanny Valley' directed by Federico Heller
Best Surfing Film : the feature documentary 'Heavy Water' by acclaimed surf filmmaker Michael Oblowitz.

BBFF2018 
The 12th Byron Bay Film Festival was held in October, during this edition 175 films were selected.

2018 Awards by categories :
Best Film Award : 'Women At War' directed by Bebedikt Erlingsson
Best Animation Award : 'Bravure' directed by Donato Sansone
Best Documentary Award : 'Backtrack boys’ directed by Catherine Scott
Best Environmental Film Award : 'Skarkwater Extinction’ directed by Rob Stewart
Best Music Video Award : 'Tied Up Right Now’
Best Short Film Award : ‘Telephone’ directed by Alistair Cheyne
Best Surf Film Award : 'Big Wata' directed by Gugi Van Der Velden
Best CinematicVR Experience Award : 'I saw the future’ directed by François Vautier

BBFF2019 
BBFF 13th edition took place between the 18 and 27 October 2019. This year, Co_Lab_Create, from October 19 to 20 2019, welcomed skilled and creative enthusiasts such as Patrick Wagner from Weta Worksho, the head of Virtual Reality for HTC Australia/NZ Priscilla Harris, as well as Charles Henden and Craig Bowler from Visitor Vision.

BBFF 2020 
The 14th BBFF was held from 23 October to 1 November 2020, as a Special Edition Festival adhering to covid restrictions. This special edition featured over 30 sessions, highlighting 52 films and included special red carpet premieres and a key talk with Jack Thompson, Wayne Blair and Pauline Clague.

BBFF 2021 
The 15th BBFF will be held from 15 to 24 October 2021.

Celebrity endorsement
Chris Hemsworth, Thor star who lives in Byron Bay, shared a video with his 6.6million Instagram followers, saying 'It's the best festival in the world'. He showed his support with Tom Hiddleston and Idris Elba, two other Thor actors.

Sources 
 Byron Bay film festival fights for international recognition by Barnaby Smith (ABC News, 25 February 2014)
 Surf flicks breaking stereotypes at Byron Bay Film Festival by Margaret Burin (ABC News, 3 March February 2014)
 Monfilsbox

References

External links
 Previous Festivals

External links
 Official BBFF website

Cultural festivals in Australia
Film festivals in Australia
Film festivals established in 2006
Byron Bay, New South Wales
Festivals in New South Wales